Cansu Bektaş (born 23 November 2003) is a Turkish weightlifter competing in the 45 kg division.

Sport career
She won the silver medal in the women's 45kg event at the 2022 European Weightlifting Championships held in Tirana, Albania.

References

External links
 

2003 births
Living people
Sportspeople from Giresun
Turkish female weightlifters
European Weightlifting Championships medalists
Islamic Solidarity Games competitors for Turkey
Islamic Solidarity Games medalists in weightlifting
21st-century Turkish sportswomen